Winterwell is a 2013 album by Mree.

Winterwell may also refer to:
 The Winterwell music festival.
 Winterwell Associates, a software company.
 Winterwell (place) a town in the United Kingdom.